Azerbaijani may refer to:

 Somebody or something related to Azerbaijan
 Azerbaijanis 
 Azerbaijani language

See also 
 Azerbaijan (disambiguation)
 Azeri (disambiguation)
 Azerbaijani cuisine
 Culture of Azerbaijan
 

Language and nationality disambiguation pages